Le Terrible  ("The terrible one") was one of six  large destroyers ("Torpedo-boat destroyer") built for the  (French Navy) during the 1930s. The ship entered service in 1936 and participated in the Second World War. Le Terrible and two of her sister ships were based in Dakar, French West Africa, to patrol the Central Atlantic for several months in late 1939. They returned to Metropolitan France before the end of the year and were transferred to French Algeria in late April 1940 in case Italy decided to enter the war. She screened French cruisers once as they unsuccessfully hunted for Italian ships after Italy declared war in June.

Le Terrible was present when the British attacked French ships in July, but was not damaged. She was sent to Dakar at the beginning of 1941 and was there when French West Africa joined the Allies in late 1942. The ship was sent to the United States for repairs and to be modernized in early 1943. Le Terrible was sent to the Mediterranean at the beginning of 1944 where she spent the rest of the year searching for Axis shipping with two of her sisters. In between raids, the ship provided naval gunfire support during Operation Dragoon, the invasion of Southern France, in mid-1944. She was badly damaged in a collision in December and spent the next year under repair.

The ship was only intermittently active for the rest of the 1940s, but was modernized to serve as an escort for French aircraft carriers in 1952–1953. She was decommissioned in mid-1955 after which she briefly became a training ship and was reduced to reserve at the end of 1956. Le Terrible was stricken in 1962 and scrapped the following year.

Design and description
Le Terrible was powered by two Rateau-Bretagne geared steam turbines, each driving one propeller shaft, using steam provided by four water-tube boilers. During her sea trials on 22 January 1935, her turbines provided  and she reached  for a single hour. The crew of the Le Fantasque class consisted of 11 officers and 221 crewmen in peacetime and the number of the latter increased to 254 in wartime.

The main armament of the Le Fantasques consisted of five Canon de  Modèle 1929 guns in single mounts, one superfiring pair fore and aft of the superstructure and the fifth gun abaft the aft funnel. Their anti-aircraft armament consisted of two Canon de  Modèle 1925 guns in single mounts positioned amidships and four Hotchkiss Mitrailleuse de  CA Modèle 1929 in two twin-gun mounts aft of the 37 mm mounts. The ships carried three above-water triple sets of  torpedo tubes; the aft mount could traverse to both sides, but the forward mounts were positioned one on each broadside. A pair of depth charge chutes were built into their stern; these housed a total of sixteen  depth charges with another dozen available in the torpedo magazine. They could also be fitted with rails capable of handling 40 naval mines.

Modifications 1938–1942
After the war began, depth-charge stowage increased to 48 and a pair of rails were installed on the stern for  depth charges. Each rail could accommodate 3 depth charges and 15 more were stored in the magazine. In early 1940 twin-gun 37 mm mounts replaced the single-gun mounts and four Browning 13.2-millimeter AA machineguns on single mounts replaced the Hotchkiss machine guns in October–November. One pair was positioned on the bridge wings and the other pair was installed on the quarterdeck. In 1941–1942 the quarterdeck guns were transferred to new platforms on the center superstructure. Le Terrible had the aft superstructure remodeled in early 1942 to create a platform atop the aft ammunition hoists and platforms on each side for 37 mm guns. The twin-gun mounts were repositioned on the upper platform and one of the lower platforms while the other one was occupied by a single mount as there was a shortage of twin-gun mounts. In May the ship was provided with an Alpha-2 sonar system in cases pending the modification of the hull to accommodate the required flexible underwater dome.

Construction and career
Ordered on 20 June 1931 as part of the 1930 Naval Program, Le Terribles hull was laid down on 8 December 1931 by Chantiers Navals Français at their shipyard in Blainville-sur-Orne and it was then towed to Ateliers et Chantiers de la Loire's Nantes shipyard for completion to help keep the former company in business. She was launched on 30 November 1933, commissioned on 15 April 1935, completed on 1 October, and entered into service on 5 February 1936. Completion was delayed when her turbines stripped some of their blades and required lengthy repairs. When the Le Fantasques entered service they were assigned to the newly formed 8th and 10th Light Divisions which were later redesignated as scout divisions; both divisions were assigned to the 2nd Light Squadron in Brest.

Albert Lebrun, President of France, inaugurated the new building of the Naval Academy in Brest and reviewed the 2nd Squadron on 30 May 1936, including L'Indomptable, L'Audacieux, Le Fantasque, and Le Terrible. Between 15 January and 26 February 1937, the 2nd Light Squadron cruised as far south as Conakry, French West Africa. On 27 May, Alphonse Gasnier-Duparc, Minister of the Navy, reviewed the fleet, including all of the Le Fantasques.

World War II
Afterwards it was dispersed into smaller groups to search for German commerce raiders and blockade runners. On 25 November, together with Le Fantasque and the heavy cruiser , Le Terrible captured the  German merchantman . The division escorted Strasbourg and the heavy cruiser  back to France on 18 November.

She took part in a sortie by the  into the Western Mediterranean on 12–13 June, after Italy declared war on the Allies on the 10th. Le Terrible was in Mers-el-Kébir when the British attacked the ships there, hoping to deny them to the Germans, on 3 July. She exited the harbor and engaged British destroyers as she escorted Strasbourg back to Toulon.

The Vichy French government established the High Sea Forces ( (FHM)) on 25 September after it negotiated rules limiting the force's activities and numbers with the Italian and German Armistice Commissions. Le Terrible completed a refit in late 1940 and was assigned to the FHM on 25 December before sailing to Dakar on 11 February 1941 as a replacement for L'Audacieux, which had been crippled by the British during the Battle of Dakar the previous September. Le Terrible returned to Toulon for a refit that lasted from 31 December 1941 to 14 June 1942.

Free French operations

After the Allies invaded French North Africa on 8 November, French West Africa and its fleet, including Le Terrible and her sister Le Fantasque, joined the Allies on 24 November. The sisters steamed to Casablanca, French Morocco, where their light anti-aircraft guns were removed, on 21 January 1943 and then to the Charlestown Navy Yard in Boston to be modernized. Arriving on 21 February, Le Terribles refit lasted until 22 May and included the addition of a license-built Alpha 128 ASDIC system, installation of SA early-warning and SF surface search radars, the removal of her aft torpedo tubes and the conversion of some boiler feedwater tanks to fuel oil to improve her range. Her AA armament now consisted of eight  Bofors guns in a quadruple mount superfiring over the aft 138.6 mm guns, and two twin mounts forward of the aft funnel; eight  Oerlikon guns were also added in single mounts, four on the sides of the bridge and the remaining guns on platforms on the aft superstructure. After the refit, she was reclassified as a light cruiser and the 10th Scout Division was redesignated as the 10th Light Cruiser Division. Despite the modernization work in Boston, the ships' turbines were prone to frequent breakdowns during heavy use and required a lot of maintenance. To compensate, the French adopted a policy of keeping two of the three ships in the 10th Light Cruiser Division (LCD) operational at any one time while the third ship was repaired.

Le Terrible visited the islands of the French West Indies just after they joined the Free French in July 1943. She departed Martinique on 30 July and arrived in Dakar on 5 August before sailing to Algiers, French Algeria, where she arrived on 15 August. Together with Le Fantasque, she sortied in search of Axis shipping off Scalea, Italy, on 20–21 August, where the ships engaged Italian motor torpedo boats and then in the Bay of Naples on 21–22 August. The sisters were among the escorts for the British Force H during the Salerno landings (Operation Avalanche) on 9 September. As the Germans began evacuating Corsica on 10 September, the Allies began landing troops. She was reclassified as a light cruiser on 28 September. On 17 October Le Fantasque and Le Terrible departed Oran, French Algeria, on 17 October to rendezvous with the battleship  at the Azores, Portugal, and escorted her to Mers-el-Kébir. The following month, the sisters conducted two unsuccessful raids searching for German shipping in the Aegean Sea on 19–20 and 22–24 November in conjunction with the British light cruiser .

In late February the 10th LCD was tasked to conduct deep raids in the Adriatic in search of German shipping. The raid on 27–28 was unsuccessful, but on the night of 18/19 March, Le Terrible and Le Fantasque encountered a German convoy and sank two Siebel ferries and damaged two other ferries. Both cruisers were struck by return fire that wounded eight men aboard Le Fantasque and one crewman on Le Terrible. The ships were refitted and then transferred to Alexandria, Egypt, to conduct patrols south of Crete and in the Aegean in April where they had no engagements. Transferred back to the Adriatic in June, Le Terrible and Le Fantasque sank the small oil tanker  on the 17th. On 15 August, the 10th LCD provided naval gunfire support during Operation Dragoon, the Allied landing in Provence, Le Terrible firing 158 shells from her main guns and then provided gunfire support for the troops advancing on Cannes. Together with Le Fantasque, Le Terrible escorted Richelieu to Toulon on 1 October. During night exercises in December, Le Terrible collided with Le Malin, severing the latter's bow and killed a total of 70 men between them.

Postwar activities
The ship was under repair at Bizerte, French Tunisia, until 1 January 1946. One of her 40 mm twin-gun mounts had been damaged beyond repair by the collision and both mounts were replaced by single guns protected by gun shields. She returned to Toulon on 26 April and then, together with Le Malin, Le Terrible made a show the flag cruise to northern Europe in May. On 1 January 1947, the 10th LCD was combined with the 4th Division of Cruisers into the Cruiser Group; during this time, only two of the four surviving ships of the class were active at any one time because of a shortage of trained personnel. Le Terrible was active in 1947 and 1948 before being decommissioned on 12 July. She was transferred to Bizerte on 27 April 1949 and placed in reserve there on 15 March 1950. All of the Le Fantasque-class ships were reclassified as escort destroyers, 1st class on 1 July 1951 and then as fast escorts in 1953. Le Terrible was refitted from 1 May 1952 to early April 1953 to serve as an escort for the French aircraft carriers and made a cruise to the Eastern Mediterranean in May–June before beginning to escort the carrier  later in June.  replaced her from February to August 1954 and the destroyer escorted La Fayette again from September 1954 to February 1955 before switching to  until August. Le Terrible arrived in Brest on 28 August where she was decommissioned on 1 September and was used as a stationary training ship for the Naval Academy. She was placed in special reserve on 1 December 1956, stricken from the Navy List on 29 June 1962 and scrapped in 1963.

References

Bibliography

 

 

Le Fantasque-class destroyers
World War II destroyers of France
Ships built in France
1933 ships